Paul Costa may refer to:

 Paul Costa (American football) (1941–2015), American football player
 Paul Costa (politician) (born 1959), American politician
 Paul Costa (skier) (born 1971), Australian Olympic skier
 Paul Costa Jr. (fl. 1970s–2020s), American psychologist

See also
 Paul Costea (born 1999), Romanian professional footballer